Stay is a 2013 film directed by Wiebke von Carolsfeld, who adapted the story from the Aislinn Hunter novel. The movie stars Taylor Schilling, Aidan Quinn, and Michael Ironside. It is a Canadian-Irish drama film co-production.

Production
The film is a joint Canadian-Irish production by Amerique Film, Samson Films and Submission Films. The producers are Martin Paul-Hus, David Collins, Andrew Boutillier and Martina Niland, and the executive producer is Mark Slone. Stay was filmed in Connemara, Country Galway, Ireland and Montréal, Québec, Canada.

Plot 
The movie Stay, based on the novel by Aislinn Hunter, is a movie about troubled young woman Abby (Taylor Schilling) who falls in love with her former professor Dermot (Aiden Quinn). The mismatched couple is very much in love from the first scene of the movie. The couple lives in Ireland where the villagers disapprove of their relationship but they remain content with their situation. But when Abby suddenly gets pregnant and is considering keeping the baby Dermot becomes irritated with her, angrily telling her that he made it clear he has no interest in being a father. Following the announcement of her pregnancy, Abby returns to her childhood home in Montreal to visit her father. Meanwhile, Dermot is deeply upset by her absence and lack of communication, he resorts to drinking. Eventually, dark secrets are revealed about the two individuals, why Dermot doesn't want to be a father and how Abby's mother disappeared during her childhood. They must both face the truth of who they are and which path in life to take that will finally lead them home.

Cast
 Taylor Schilling as Abbey
 Aidan Quinn as Dermot Fay
 Michael Ironside as Frank
 Brian Gleeson as Liam Meehan
 Barry Keoghan as Sean Meehan
 Rayleen Kenny as Mary Meehan
 Danika McGuigan as Deirdre McGilloway
 Chris McHallem as Michael
 Pascale Montpetit as Celine

References

External links
 
 Stay at Library and Archives Canada

2013 films
2013 romantic drama films
English-language Canadian films
Canadian romantic drama films
English-language Irish films
Irish romantic drama films
Films directed by Wiebke von Carolsfeld
2010s English-language films
2010s Canadian films